Terpsichore (minor planet designation: 81 Terpsichore) is a large and very dark main-belt asteroid. It has most probably a very primitive carbonaceous composition. It was found by the prolific comet discoverer Ernst Tempel on September 30, 1864. It is named after Terpsichore, the Muse of dance in Greek mythology.

This result is consistent with previous determinations. Two stellar occultation events involving this asteroid were observed from multiple sites in 2009. The resulting chords matched a smooth elliptical cross-section with dimensions of  × .

In popular culture 
A space station orbiting 81 Terpsichore is the main setting in the science fiction story The Dark Colony (Asteroid Police Book 1) by Richard Penn.

References

External links 
 
 

Terpsichore asteroids
Terpsichore
Terpsichore
C-type asteroids (Tholen)
Cb-type asteroids (SMASS)
18640930